Bryan Perrett (born 9 July 1934 in Liverpool) is a military historian and author. He served in the Royal Tank Regiment. He was the defense correspondent for the Liverpool Echo during the Falklands War and Gulf War. He is particularly noted for his work on armoured warfare.

Works

Through Mud and Blood: Infantry/Tank Operations in World War II (1975)
Blitzkrieg!: A History of the Nazis' Lightning War (1985)
Last Stand: Famous Battles Against The Odds 
Tank Tracks to Rangoon: The Story of British Armour in Burma 
Against All Odds! 
The Hunters and the Hunted: The Elimination of German Surface Warships around the World 1914-15
Heroes Of The Hour: Brief Moments of Military Glory
Why the Japanese Lost: The Red Sun's Setting
Iron Fist: Classic Armoured Warfare: Classic Armoured Warfare Case Studies 
Gunboat!: Small Ships At War
Why the Germans Lost: The Rise and Fall of the Black Eagle
For Valour
My Story: D-Day
North Sea Battleground: The War and Sea, 1914–1918
The Battle Book: Crucial Conflicts in History from 1469 BC to the Present
Fighting Vehicles of the Red Army (1970)
Allied Tanks, North Africa, World War II (1986)
The Real Hornblower: The Life of Rear Admiral Sir James Gordon GCB Annapolis (1997)
British Military History For Dummies

References

Living people
1934 births
British military historians